Epervier may refer to:

Epervier, a French brig-sloop operating as a privateer when captured by the British in 1797
Epervier, a French Navy brig-sloop captured by the British in 1803
 , the name of various ships of the British Royal Navy
USS Epervier (1814), a United States Navy sloop-of-war in commission from 1814 to 1815

Ships of the United Kingdom